Bandar Seri or Bandar Sri may refer to:

 Bandar Seri Alam, Mukim Plentong, Johor Bahru District, Johor, Malaysia
 Bandar Seri Bandi, a small town in Kemaman District, Terengganu, Malaysia
 Bandar Seri Begawan, capital of Brunei
 Bandar Seri Botani, a new township in Ipoh, Perak, Malaysia
 Bandar Seri Iskandar, a satellite town of Seri Iskandar, Perak Tengah District, Perak, Malaysia
 Bandar Seri Jempol, town and planned capital of Jempol District, Negeri Sembilan, Malaysia
 Bandar Sri Permaisuri, a township in Cheras, Kuala Lumpur, Malaysia
 Bandar Seri Putra, a township in Bangi, Hulu Langat District, Selangor, Malaysia
 Bandar Sri Sendayan, a planned township in Rantau, Seremban District, Negeri Sembilan, Malaysia